Time of Taiga Snowdrop is a 1958 Soviet drama film directed by Yaropolk Lapshin.

Plot 
The film takes place after the October Revolution. The Red Army soldiers stop at the Akhsai farm and observe the inhuman attitude of the owner of the family, Akhsay, towards his bride and younger brother. Meanwhile, the White Guards are developing a plan for the defeat of the Red Army detachment.

Cast 
 Valentina Dagbayeva as Dynsema
 Buda Vampilov as Akhsay
 Mariya Stepanova as Zhalmasu
 Naydan Gendunova as Shabgansa
 Buyanto Ayushin as Sodnom
 Vladimir Kadochnikov 
 Raisa Kurkina as Anna
 Yuri Leonidov as Stepan
 Vladimir Manketov as Gylyk
 Pyotr Nikolayev as Galsan
 Fyodor Sakhirov as Bair 
 Tsyren Shagzhin as Tikhonya

References

External links 
 
 Пора таёжного подснежника on Kinopoisk

1958 films
1950s Russian-language films
Soviet drama films
1958 drama films